Aleksandr Perov can refer to:

 Aleksandr Perov (cyclist) (born 1954), a Soviet former cyclist and Olympic medalist
 Aleksandr Perov (footballer) (born 1978), a Russian professional football coach and a former player